Doris Seidler  Falkoff (1912–2010) was an English painter, printmaker and graphic artist.

Biography
Seidler was born in London, England in 1912.

After fears of German invasion in 1940, she moved with her Jewish husband and son, David Seidler, to New York city. There, she studied under Hayter at Atelier 17 during the second world war, learning the techniques of print-making. In 1945 she returned to England, where she had her first solo exhibitions at the art schools of Norwich, Ipswich and Great Yarmouth. She immigrated back to New York in 1948 and again studied at Atelier 17. Her first solo exhibition in New York was at Wittenborn Gallery in 1954.

Seidler is known for her use of techniques such as intaglio engraving, woodcut, lucite engraving and collage with paper. Her work is included in the collection of the Seattle Art Museum.

Seidler died on October 30, 2010, in New York City.

Permanent collections 
 Whitney Museum of American Art 
 Museum of Modern Art, New York.
 British Museum
 Library of Congress
 Philadelphia Museum of Art
 Seattle art museum
 Pallant House Gallery

References

1912 births
2010 deaths
20th-century English women artists
21st-century English women artists
Artists from London
British printmakers
English women artists
Women printmakers